Taylor Moton (born August 18, 1994) is an American football offensive tackle for the Carolina Panthers of the National Football League (NFL). He played college football at Western Michigan. He was drafted by the Panthers in the second round of the 2017 NFL Draft.

Early years
Moton attended Okemos High School in Okemos, Michigan. He played football, basketball and ran track.

College career
Moton played at Western Michigan from 2012 to 2016. During his career he set a school record with 52 career starts.

Professional career
Moton received an invitation to the Senior Bowl and played offensive tackle for the North who lost 15-16 to the South. He attended the NFL Combine and completed all of the combine and positional drills. A dozen NFL scouts attended Western Michigan's Pro Day, as Moton only ran positional drills with 13 other prospects. NFL draft experts and analysts projected him to be a second or third round pick in the 2017 NFL draft. He was ranked the fourth best offensive tackle in the draft by NFL analyst Mike Mayock and was ranked the fifth best offensive tackle by Sports Illustrated, NFLDraftScout.com, and ESPN.

The Carolina Panthers selected Moton in the second round (64th overall) of the 2017 NFL Draft. The pick used to select Moton was acquired in a trade with the New England Patriots in a trade that sent Kony Ealy to the Patriots. On May 4, 2017, the Carolina Panthers signed Moton to a four-year, $4.15 million contract with $2.28 million guaranteed and a signing bonus of $1.16 million.

Moton was named the Panthers starting right tackle in 2018, and started every game the next three seasons.

Set to be an unrestricted free agent, the Panthers placed the franchise tag on Moton on March 9, 2021. He signed the one-year contract two days later. On July 15, 2021, Moton signed a four-year, $71.25 million contract extension with the Panthers, worth $43 million in guarantees.

References

External links
 Western Michigan Broncos bio
 Carolina Panthers bio

1994 births
Living people
Sportspeople from Lansing, Michigan
Players of American football from Michigan
American football offensive tackles
American football offensive guards
Western Michigan Broncos football players
Carolina Panthers players